Ketcham's fort was a 19th-century fort northeast of Fort Vallonia in Jackson County, Indiana.

Established
Ketcham's fort was established around 1811 or 1812 on John Ketcham's land near the east fork of the White River for the protection of early settlers of what is now the township of Brownstown. It was said not to have the fortifications of Vallonia but served as an important outpost as did Huff's fort a bit closer to Fort Vallonia.

References

Buildings and structures in Jackson County, Indiana
Forts in Indiana
Indiana in the War of 1812
Pre-statehood history of Indiana